Catolé do Rocha is a municipality in the state of Paraíba in the Northeast Region of Brazil.

See also
List of municipalities in Paraíba

Notable people 

 João Suassuna, (1886-1930), politic, president of Paraíba

References

Municipalities in Paraíba